The 1947 LSU Tigers football team represented Louisiana State University (LSU) in the 1947 college football season.

Schedule

Personnel
QB Y.A. Tittle

References

LSU
LSU Tigers football seasons
LSU Tigers football